My Widow and I is a 1945 Italian comedy film directed by Carlo Ludovico Bragaglia and starring Vittorio De Sica, Isa Miranda and Gino Cervi.

Plot  
The young Adriano Lari, perhaps due to congestion, finds himself in a state of catalepsy and is pronounced dead. The night before the funeral he wakes and despite the opposition of his wife decides to pretend to be dead so his wife can collect the insurance premium.

Cast 

Vittorio De Sica as Adriano Lari
Isa Miranda as  Maria, sua moglie
Gino Cervi as Mr. Guglielmi
Dina Galli as Adriano's Mother
Luigi Almirante  as The Cemetery Caretaker
 Edda Soligo as The Neighbor
 Giuseppe Pierozzi as The Doctor
Amalia Pellegrini
Liliana Laine

References

External links

1945 comedy films
1945 films
Italian comedy films
Films directed by Carlo Ludovico Bragaglia
Italian black-and-white films
1940s Italian films